Robert III of Dreux (1185–1234), Count of Dreux and Braine, was the  son of Robert II, Count of Dreux, and Yolanda de Coucy. He was given the byname Gasteblé (lit. wheat-spoiler) when he destroyed a field of wheat while hunting in his youth.

Along with his brother Peter, Duke of Brittany he fought with future Louis VIII of France in 1212 at Nantes and was captured there during a sortie. Exchanged after the Battle of Bouvines for William Longsword, Earl of Salisbury, he fought in the Albigensian Crusade, besieging Avignon in 1226. He was a supporter of Blanche of Castile during her regency after the death of Louis VIII in 1226.

In 1210 he married Alianor de St. Valéry (1192–15 Nov 1250) and they had several children:
 Yolande of Dreux (1212–1248), who married Hugh IV, Duke of Burgundy
 John I (1215–1249), later Count of Dreux.
 Robert (1217–1264), Viscount of Châteaudun.
 Peter (1220–1250), a cleric.

References

Sources

Dreux, Robert III, Count of
Dreux, Robert III, Count of
Counts of Dreux
House of Dreux
Dreux, Robert III, Count of
Burials at the Abbey of Saint-Yved de Braine